The 2005 Qatar Open, known as the 2005 Qatar ExxonMobil Open, for sponsorship reasons,  was a men's ATP tournament held in Doha, Qatar. It was the 13th edition of the tournament and was held from 3 January through 10 January 2005. First-seeded Roger Federer won the singles title.

Finals

Singles

 Roger Federer defeated  Ivan Ljubičić, 6–3, 6–1
 It was Federer's 1st title of the year and the 23rd of his career.

Doubles

 Albert Costa /  Rafael Nadal defeated  Andrei Pavel /  Mikhail Youzhny, 6–3, 4–6, 6–3
 It was Costa's only title of the year and the 13th of his career. It was Nadal's 1st title of the year and the 4th of his career.

References

External links
 
 ATP tournament profile

 
Qatar Open
2005 in Qatari sport
Qatar Open (tennis)